Erling Sande (born 8 November 1979 in Bremanger) is a Norwegian politician for the Centre Party (SP). He represents Sogn og Fjordane in the Norwegian Parliament, where he meets in the place of Liv Signe Navarsete, who was appointed to a government position.

Parliamentary Committee duties 
2005 - 2009 member of the Standing Committee on Family and Cultural Affairs.

External links

1979 births
Living people
Members of the Storting
Centre Party (Norway) politicians
21st-century Norwegian politicians
People from Bremanger